The tomato looper or golden twin-spot moth (Chrysodeixis chalcites) is a moth of the family Noctuidae, subfamily Plusiinae. It mainly lives in southern Europe, the Levant and tropical Africa, but can be seen migrating across much of Europe. In 2013, it was spotted in Canada. It is an important horticultural pest in New Zealand.

The length of the forewings is 15–18 mm. The moth flies from June to October.

The larvae feed on various herbaceous plants, such as Echium vulgare, Apium, Rubus, tomato, Fragaria and tobacco which is why it is perceived as a pest.

Chrysodeixis chalcites and Chrysodeixis eriosoma moths cannot be separated morphologically and they may be sibling species. They are distinguished by DNA, pheromones and geographic origin, as C. chalcites is found in the palearctic and C. eriosoma in the tropics and subtropics. The literature referring to C. chalcites in southern and eastern Asia or Oceania may actually refer to C. eriosoma.

Notes
 The flight season refers to The Netherlands. This may vary in other parts of the range.

References

External links

Golden twin-spot on UKmoths
Fauna Europaea
Lepiforum.de
Vlindernet.nl 

Plusiinae
Owlet moths of Europe
Owlet moths of Africa
Moths of Cape Verde
Moths of the Comoros
Moths of Asia
Moths of Madagascar
Moths of Mauritius
Moths of the Middle East
Moths of Réunion
Moths of São Tomé and Príncipe
Moths of Seychelles
Moths of New Zealand
Taxa named by Eugenius Johann Christoph Esper
Moths described in 1789